This article contains information about the literary events and publications of 1787.

Events
January 15 – Ann Ward marries William Radcliffe, gaining the surname by which she will be known as a writer of Gothic novels.
April 16 – Royall Tyler's The Contrast becomes the first comedy written by an American citizen to be professionally produced, at the John Street Theatre (Manhattan).
April 17 – The Edinburgh edition of Robert Burns' Poems, Chiefly in the Scottish Dialect is published by William Creech. It includes a Burns portrait by Alexander Nasmyth. The poet has great social success in the city's literary circles; 16-year-old Walter Scott meets him at the house of Adam Ferguson. 
June 1 – King George III of Great Britain issues a Proclamation for the Discouragement of Vice, which can be used to prosecute obscene publications.
June 27 – Just before midnight, Edward Gibbon completes The History of the Decline and Fall of the Roman Empire in the small summerhouse in his garden in Lausanne, Switzerland.
July – Friedrich Schiller arrives in Weimar.
November 21 – François-Joseph Talma makes his professional stage debut at the Comédie-Française as Seide, in Voltaire's Mahomet.
December 4 – Robert Burns meets Agnes Maclehose at a party given by Miss Erskine Nimmo.

New books

Fiction
Elizabeth Bonhôte – Olivia, or, The Deserted Bride
Jean-Baptiste Louvet de Couvrai – Les Amours du chevalier de Faublas
Johann Wolfgang von Goethe – The Sorrows of Young Werther (revised edition)
Johann Jakob Wilhelm Heinse – Ardinghello and die glückseligen Inseln
Elizabeth Helme – Louisa; or the Cottage on the Moor
Johann Karl August Musäus – Volksmärchen der Deutschen (fifth volume)
Elizabeth Sophia Tomlins – The Victim of Fancy
Betje Wolff and Aagje Deken – Abraham Blankaart

Children
 François Guillaume Ducray-Duminil – Fanfan et Lolotte, ou Histoire de deux enfants abandonnés dans une île déserte (Fanfan and Lolotte, Story of Two Children Abandoned on a Desert Island)

Drama
Pierre Beaumarchais – Tarare (opera)
George Colman the Younger – Inkle and Yarico (comic opera)
Richard Cumberland – The Country Attorney<ref>Watson, George. The New Cambridge Bibliography of English Literature: Volume 2, 1660-1800. Cambridge University Press, 1971. Page 1968.</ref>
Germaine de Staël – Jeanne GreyThomas Holcroft – SeductionHarriet Lee – The New PeerageFriedrich Schiller – Don Karlos, Infant von SpanienRoyall Tyler – The ContrastPoetry

Non-fiction
Thomas Best – A Concise Treatise on the Art of AnglingMathurin Jacques Brisson – Pesanteur Spécifique des CorpsOttobah Cugoano – Thoughts and Sentiments on the Evil and Wicked Traffic of the Slavery and Commerce of the Human Species(Sir) John Fenn (ed.) – The Paston Letters (Original letters, written during the reigns of Henry VI, Edward IV, and Richard III)
John Hawkins – Life of Samuel JohnsonScots Musical Museum, vol. 1
Mary Wollstonecraft – Thoughts on the Education of Daughters''

Births
February 2 – Charles Etienne Boniface, French music teacher, playwright and journalist (died 1853)
February 17 – George Mogridge ("Old Humphrey"), English children's writer and poet (died 1854)
February 23 – Emma Willard, American teacher and writer (died 1870)
April 26 – Ludwig Uhland, German poet (died 1862)
May 29 – Konstantin Batyushkov, Russian poet, essayist and translator (died 1855)
July 9 – Taliesin Williams, Welsh poet and author (died 1847)
September 13 – John Adamson, English antiquary and expert on Portuguese (died 1855)
November 4 – Edmund Kean, English actor (died 1833)
November 15 – Richard Henry Dana Sr., American poet, critic and lawyer (died 1879)
November 21 – Bryan Procter (Barry Cornwall), English poet (died 1874)
December 16 – Mary Russell Mitford, English novelist (died 1855)

Deaths
April 1 – Floyer Sydenham, English classical scholar and translator (born 1710)
April 2 – Francisco Javier Clavijero, Mexican-born historian (born 1731)
May 4 – Philip Skelton, Irish clergyman and writer (born 1707)
June 19 – John Brown, Scottish theologian (born 1722)
October 28 – Johann Karl August Musäus, German satirist and children's writer (born 1735)
October 30 – Ferdinando Galiani, Italian economist (born 1728)
November 3 – Robert Lowth, English poet, grammarian and bishop (born 1710)
December 18 – Soame Jenyns, English poet and essayist (born 1704)

References

 
Years of the 18th century in literature